The Lý dynasty (1009–1225), founded by the Lý clan, was an imperial dynasty of Đại Việt that succeeded the Early Lê dynasty (980–1009) and preceded the Trần dynasty (1225–1400). The first emperor of the dynasty was Lý Thái Tổ (974–1028). The dynasty ended with the usurpation of throne from Lý Chiêu Hoàng (1218–1278) by Trần Thủ Độ, the head of Trần clan. Below is a complete list of emperors of the Lý dynasty, including their temple names, given names, and era names. Each name is presented in the Vietnamese alphabet and Chinese characters. Posthumous names, which were usually very long and rarely used when referring to the sovereign, are presented in last column.

Emperors

A: Under pressure of Trần Thủ Độ, leader of Trần clan, Huệ Tông had to pass the throne to his daughter, Chiêu Thánh Princess, and became a Buddhist priest. After the Trần clan overthrew Lý clan to become the reigning force, Huệ Tông was obliged to commit suicide after Trần Thủ Độ's advice.
B: The only woman in the feudal history of Vietnam to assume the title of Empress Regnant. She was forced by Trần Thủ Độ, leader of Trần clan, to cede the throne to her husband, Trần Cảnh, who thereafter became Trần Thái Tông, the first emperor of Trần dynasty.

Chronicle

References

Sources
 
 

Lý dynasty